Nathaniel Monroe Marshall (June 13, 1854 Schuyler Falls, Clinton County, New York – February 16, 1935 Malone, Franklin County, New York) was an American banker and politician.

Life
He was the son of Nathaniel Marshall and Ann L. (Hackstaff) Marshall. In 1874, he became a telegraph operator and station agent for the Chateaugay Railroad at Plattsburgh, New York. Later he removed to Bellmont, New York where he was employed as a bookkeeper by the Chateaugay Ore and Iron Company. On May 15, 1877, he married Lucy Ann Bellows (d. 1920), and they had two daughters and a son.

He entered politics as a Republican, and in 1885, he was supervisor of the Town of Bellmont, and the same year was elected county clerk of Franklin County, which post he held for two terms. Afterwards he became a claim adjuster for the Fidelity and Casualty Company until 1895, when he became vice president of the Farmers National Bank of Malone. In 1896, he transferred to the Peoples National Bank, later Peoples Trust Company, of Malone, of which he was vice president until 1898, president until 1930, and chairman of the board until his death.

He was a member of the New York State Senate (34th D.) from 1915 to 1920, sitting in the 138th, 139th, 140th, 141st, 142nd and 143rd New York State Legislature. He was New York State Treasurer from 1921 to 1922, elected at the New York state election, 1920, but defeated for re-election at the New York state election, 1922. He was a delegate to the 1928 Republican National Convention.

Sources
 The state tickets, in NYT on November 5, 1922
Shatagee Woods History: Hon. N. M. Marshall Ends Useful Life of Public Service at blogspot.com Obit in the Malone Farmer on February 20, 1935

1854 births
1935 deaths
New York State Treasurers
People from Schuyler Falls, New York
Politicians from Plattsburgh, New York
American bankers
Republican Party New York (state) state senators
Town supervisors in New York (state)
People from Franklin County, New York